New Malden is an area in South West London, England. Neighbouring localities include Kingston, Norbiton, Raynes Park, Surbiton, Tolworth, Wimbledon and Worcester Park. Prior to the creation of Greater London in 1965, New Malden was in the administrative county of Surrey.

History
New Malden was established as a result of the arrival of the railway. What is now New Malden railway station was opened on 1 December 1846 on the main line from London Waterloo.

Building started slowly in the area just to the north of the station, gathering pace in the late nineteenth and early twentieth centuries with two- and three-bedroom terraced houses. Further out towards Coombe Hill are larger detached and semi-detached houses built in the 1930s. The name of the road which leads up the hill to Coombe, Traps Lane, is thought to derive from a farm owned by a Mrs Trap. Following the opening of the Kingston bypass in 1927, the farms to its south were progressively developed for housing.

Two miles (3 km) to the south is the former village of Old Malden  the origins of which are Anglo-Saxon, the name being Old English for Mæl + duna = "the cross on the hill".

Under the District Councils Act 1895, The Maldens & Coombe Urban District Council was created (the plural relating to Old Malden and New Malden). In 1936 Malden and Coombe was granted full Borough status, with its own Mayor, and had the rare distinction of a civic mace bearing the royal insignia of King Edward VIII.

New Malden suffered damage from German bombing during the Second World War. The first attack took place on 16 August 1940, killing about 50 people and damaging about 1,300 homes. After dropping about 150 bombs, German aircraft reportedly flew over the railway station at low altitude and machine-gunned passengers as they disembarked from a train. Unexploded munitions from this period are still found on occasion.
In 1965, the London Government Act 1963 came into force merging the boroughs of Malden & Coombe and Surbiton with Kingston upon Thames to form the Royal Borough of Kingston upon Thames.

New Malden contains offices of several large organisations. One such was Nestlé Purina Pet Foods (before 1997 Spillers Pet Foods) - until 2012 when Nestlé moved its UK headquarters to Gatwick, and Northrop Grumman.

Description
New Malden is bounded to the north by the affluent Coombe Hill and to the south and east by Raynes Park, Tolworth and Worcester Park. New Malden includes Motspur Park, home to the training ground of Fulham FC, and also the King's College London sports ground, home to the training ground of AFC Wimbledon.

 To the west: Kingston upon Thames, Norbiton
 To the south: Old Malden, Surbiton, Tolworth, Worcester Park
 To the east: Motspur Park, Raynes Park, West Barnes
 To the north: Coombe, Richmond Park, Wimbledon

The busy A3 trunk road runs through part of New Malden. A minor tributary of the River Thames, Beverley Brook, flows through the east of the town, while its western boundary is along the Hogsmill, another Thames tributary.

The first parking meters were made in New Malden at Venners Ltd.

Demographics

Korean community

The Royal Borough of Kingston upon Thames has one of the largest expatriate communities of South Koreans in Europe, and is said to be one of the most densely populated areas of Koreans outside South Korea. According to different sources, as of 2014 there were about 10,000 ethnic Koreans in New Malden proper, and as of the same year the Korean population in the area around New Malden is around 20,000, including about 600 originating from North Korea, giving it the largest group of North Koreans in Europe. In the 2001 census, some small areas of New Malden had "Other Asian" (i.e., other than of Indian sub-continental origin, which also included Chinese) populations of "over 25%", though no whole ward reached over 20%. Many of the Koreans living in New Malden work for Korean companies, and they are either permanently settled and formerly expatriate, or they are still expatriates.

The New Malden area has Korean language churches and nursery schools as well as restaurants and shops with Korean clientele. New Malden functions as the shopping and cultural centre for a Korean population spread more widely across South-West London and the neighbouring counties. The area has Korean supermarkets, about 20 Korean restaurants and cafes, including those serving bulgogi. It also has a noraebang (Karaoke bar), and many other shops. The Korean language is visible on several shop signs. The original Embassy of South Korea was in New Malden, before moving to 60 Buckingham Gate in Westminster.

Some factors cited in The Daily Telegraph as reasons why the Korean community formed in New Malden included a 1950s joint venture partnership between a chaebol and Racal Avionics (formerly Decca), Lord Chancellor's Walk in Coombe Lane West previously serving as the residence of the Ambassador of South Korea to the United Kingdom, and Samsung Electronics having its UK offices in New Malden until they moved to their current location in Chertsey, Surrey in 2005. Many Koreans settled in New Malden in the 1970s due to the ambassador's location.

Other

There is a Hindu temple in the eastern part of Burlington Road with a notable community of predominantly Sri Lankan Tamils living in the area. In 2016 New Malden gained twin city status with Jaffna, Sri Lanka and a permanent plaque was erected to celebrate this.

Amenities

New Malden has its own sports centre, the Malden Centre, which includes a swimming pool, gym and community facilities. It also runs several adult learning courses.

Beverley Park provides a football pitch, tennis courts, children's playground, allotments and open space.

Tudor Williams Ltd, established in 1913 but closed in 2019, was a family run department store in the High Street. The company also has shops in Cobham and Dorking and expanded by acquiring department stores Elphicks of Farnham in October 2004, and Knights of Reigate in September 2006.  A branch of Waitrose is one of a number of other well known stores in the High Street.

The local newspapers are the Surrey Comet which has been in print since 1854, Coombe Monthly, and the Kingston Guardian.

A monthly publication, The Village Voice,  covers local history, news, topical articles and advertisements for businesses serving the community.

There is an annual Malden Fortnight, which includes a parade showcasing all the local schools and community groups and various other activities.

Each Christmas the High Street is festooned with Christmas lights with its own switching-on ceremony. The choir from Christ Church School, in New Malden sing Christmas carols to the townsfolk.

For a small town it is more than proportionately blessed with winners of the Victoria Cross.  Research recently published in the Village Voice revealed the existence of a previously unknown third medal winner – see Notable Residents below.

New Malden has its own youth theatre, the Green Theatre Company, established in 1986 in a converted cricket pavilion at Barton Green. Green Theatre Company

The area's last surviving cinema, the Odeon at Shannon Corner on the A3 was replaced by a large retail area including several large stores. The other cinema in the High Street (corner of Sussex Road) burnt down on Boxing Day 1936. There was also a silent cinema on Coombe Road by the station, which became the New Malden Gentlemen's Club in 1923; this closed in August 2010, and is now a Korean karaoke and pool bar.

New Malden also has its own "Dino-Golf" course, 18 holes of dinosaur themed crazy golf overlooking the A3, as well as a floodlit golf driving range.

In recent times New Malden played host to the biggest B&Q, Tesco and Currys. This Currys is the biggest electrical store in London.  These are situated away from the High Street, which focuses more on smaller, more upmarket shops and restaurants.

New Malden is home to the playing fields of both King's College London and the London School of Economics, which are available for hire when not in use by university teams.

Notable open spaces
 Wimbledon Common
 Bushy Park
 Beverley Park
 Blagdon Open Space
 Dickerage Road Park

Education and schools

 Burlington (primary and nursery)
 Christ Church (primary and nursery, Church of England)
 Coombe Boys' School (secondary; "Beverley" prior to 2006)
 Coombe Girls' School (secondary; mixed-gender sixth form)
 Coombe Hill Junior School (primary)
 Corpus Christi (primary and nursery, Roman Catholic)
 Holy Cross (secondary, Roman Catholic School)
 King's Oak (primary and nursery; formerly, "The Mount")
 Malden Manor (primary and nursery)
 Richard Challoner (secondary, Roman Catholic)
 Sacred Heart (primary)
 Study School (primary)

Transport

Rail

New Malden railway station has services provided by South Western Railway to London Waterloo, Hampton Court, Kingston, Richmond and Shepperton. It is in London Zone 4. The Old Malden area is well served by trains from Malden Manor railway station, travelling north to London Waterloo and south to Chessington. Motspur Park railway station on the New Malden/Raynes Park borders also has rail connections to Chessington South, Epsom, Leatherhead and Dorking.

Bus

There are many routes of London Buses going through New Malden, including route 213 route going from Kingston towards Sutton, routes 131 and N87 going through Kingston Town Centre and Tooting Broadway (and Aldwych for the night bus) along with the X26 express bus to Croydon and Heathrow Airport, route 152 from New Malden towards Pollards Hill and route 265 towards Tolworth, Roehampton and Putney. The town also has a series of local bus routes, including K1 which goes to Kingston and New Malden station and K5 to Ham and Morden.

Notable residents

Notable former or current residents include:

 Cyril Barton – posthumously awarded the Victoria Cross during World War II
 Ian Bazalgette – posthumously awarded the Victoria Cross during World War II
 Tracy Borman, historian and author, lives in New Malden.
 Bernard Braden – TV personality, popular during the 1960s and early 1970s
 Jane Campbell, Baroness Campbell of Surbiton – British peer and Commissioner of the Equality and Human Rights Commission
 Anthony Caro, sculptor, was born here in 1924.
 Vernon Corea – Sri Lankan TV pioneer
 Paul Geraghty – author/illustrator
 Tom Holland – actor
 Barbara Kelly – TV personality
 David Kynaston – author, historian
 John Martyn – singer-songwriter
 Sally Morgan – celebrity psychic medium
 Jamal Musiala – footballer, attended Corpus Christi RC Primary School in New Malden.
 Cyril Power – artist
 Diana Rigg – actress
 Luke Sital-Singh – singer-songwriter
 Colin Southgate – businessman
 Stormzy – rapper, singer and songwriter
 Max Wall – actor, comedian and entertainer
 Eileen Way, actress and activist, was born in New Malden.
 Jamie Woon – singer-songwriter

New Malden also has links to a third recipient of the Victoria Cross, Humphrey Osbaldston Brooke Firman VC, whose parents lived in Coombe at the time of his death. A plaque bearing his name was unveiled on the war memorial in the High Street during April 2008 and a road in a new housing development near the High Street has been named Firman Close.

In popular culture
 In the BBC TV series The Fall and Rise of Reginald Perrin, New Malden features twice in the list of excuses Perrin made to his boss for his late arrival at work; one of the claims made is that a badger ate the signal box there.
 The house on the corner of Dukes Avenue/Howard Road featured in the exterior shots of 1970s ITV series Bless This House, which featured comedian Sid James.
 In 2004, Tesco reported that the New Malden store was the biggest consumer of fruit and vegetables in the country, in relation to items of fruit purchased per customer. It is thought that the Korean diet contributes significantly to this.
 In the BBC One television series Little Britain, character Marjorie Dawes hosts weekly FatFighters meetings at a community centre in New Malden.
 Mentioned in a mid-1990s MasterCard advert – "New York? The furthest he's ever been is New Malden!"
 Mentioned briefly on the radio traffic report in the BBC television series Outnumbered.
 Mentioned in Stephen Fry's autobiography Moab is my Washpot. "I suppose some rat faced weasel from New Malden will be interviewed at any minute to give the other side of the hunting debate" (page 45)
 The Duke of Cambridge pub, now a Krispy Kreme doughnut store, was acquired during the early 1960s by the notorious Kray twins who ran it as a bar and club; the then current world heavyweight boxing champion Sonny Liston attended the reopening night.
 Malden features in an episode of Monty Python's Flying Circus, in which the "North Malden Icelandic Saga Society" change the script to the BBC's production of the Icelandic legend "Njorl's Saga" to incorporate references to Malden in an effort to attract investors.  (Episode 1, Series 3)
 In the BBC sketch-comedy series Tracey Ullman's Show comedian Tracey Ullman's OAP character Kay Clark lives with her 103-year-old mother in New Malden.
 At the start of series 3 of the British spy thriller television series, Killing Eve, Sandra Oh's character, Eve Polastri, is living and working in a Korean restaurant located in New Malden.  The location is clearly identified on screen as New Malden.
 In BBC One sitcom Not Going Out series 10 episode 3,  Lee Mack's character visits and buys various items from an adult shop, to spice up his love life with wife Lucy (Sally Bretton). The shop used (and renamed 'Untold Pleasures' for this episode) is the Private adult shop at 203 Kingston Road, New Malden.

Sports

Cricket
Kingstonian Cricket Club (1989)

See also
 Koreatown, Los Angeles
 Spring Branch, Houston, the centre of the Korean community in Houston, Texas
 Oseyo-H Mart

Notes

 
Areas of London
Districts of the Royal Borough of Kingston upon Thames
Districts of the London Borough of Merton
Koreatowns
Ethnic enclaves in the United Kingdom
District centres of London